Gramercy Funds Management is an investment manager dedicated to emerging markets. 

The firm is headquartered in Greenwich, Connecticut with offices in London, and Buenos Aires.

Gramercy was founded in 1998 and is registered with the U.S. Securities and Exchange Commission (SEC) under the Investment Advisors Act of 1940.

History
Gramercy was founded in 1998 by Robert Koenigsberger, Managing Partner and Chief Investment Officer.

Gramercy Strategies and Funds 
Public Credit
	Gramercy Distressed Opportunity Funds II & III 
	Gramercy Distressed Argentina Funds III & IV
	Gramercy Venezuela Opportunity Fund 
	Gramercy Corporate Emerging Markets Debt  
	Gramercy High Yield Corporate Emerging Markets Debt  
	Gramercy Local Currency Emerging Market Debt  
	Gramercy U.S. Dollar Emerging Market Debt 
	Gramercy EMD Allocation  
Capital Solutions and Private Credit
	Gramercy Capital Solutions Fund
Special Situations
	Gramercy Special Situations Funds/Opportunities
Multi Asset
	Gramercy Multi-Asset Portfolio - GMAP

References

External links
 Gramercy Funds Management LLC website

Hedge fund firms in Connecticut
Financial services companies established in 1998
Companies based in Greenwich, Connecticut